Over the Hills is the sixth solo album by New York singer–songwriter Lucy Kaplansky, released in 2007.  The album contains a mix of covers and original songs written with her husband, Rick Litvin.

The album is dedicated to the memories of the artist's father, Irving Kaplansky, and Red House Records founder, Bob Feldman.  Several of the songs acknowledge the "gifts" that Kaplansky has received from these men.

Over the Hills topped the Folk Radio Airplay Chart in March 2007.

Track listing 
Unless noted otherwise, lyrics by Lucy Kaplansky & Richard Litvin, music by Lucy Kaplansky
 "Manhattan Moon" – 3:54  
Larry Campbell - pedal steel guitar
Duke Levine - mandola
Stephan Crump - acoustic bass
Ben Wittman - percussion, harmonium
Lucy Kaplansky - acoustic guitar, background vocals
 "Amelia" – 4:08  
Larry Campbell - electric slide guitar, acoustic guitar
Duke Levine - electric guitar
Stephan Crump - acoustic bass
Ben Wittman - drum set, 12-string electric guitar
Lucy Kaplansky - background vocals
 "More Than This" (Bryan Ferry) – 4:22  
Larry Campbell - pedal steel guitar
Duke Levine - National steel guitar
Stephan Crump - acoustic bass
Ben Wittman - harmonium
Jonatha Brooke - background vocals
Lucy Kaplansky - acoustic guitar
 "Ring of Fire" (June Carter, Merle Kilgore) – 4:25  
Larry Campbell - electric guitar
Duke Levine - electric guitar
Stephan Crump - acoustic bass
Ben Wittman - drum set, organ
Lucy Kaplansky - acoustic guitar, background vocals
 "Swimming Song" (Loudon Wainwright III) – 3:01  
Larry Campbell - fiddle, National steel guitar
Duke Levine - electric guitar
Stephan Crump - acoustic bass
Ben Wittman - percussion
Charles Giordano - accordion
Richard Shindell -background vocals
Lucy Kaplansky - acoustic guitar, background vocals
 "Today's the Day" – 3:11  
Ben Wittman - harmonium
Lucy Kaplansky - acoustic guitar, background vocals
 "Over the Hills" – 3:45  
Charlie Giordano - accordion
Jon Herington - acoustic guitar
Stephan Crump - acoustic bass
Eliza Gilkyson - background vocals
Ben Wittman - harmonium
Lucy Kaplansky - acoustic guitar, background vocals
 "Somewhere Trouble Don't Go" (Julie Miller) – 3:31  
Larry Campbell - electric slide guitar
Duke Levine - mandola
Stephan Crump - acoustic bass
Ben Wittman - percussion
Buddy Miller - background vocals
Lucy Kaplansky - background vocals
 "Someday Soon" (Ian Tyson) – 4:01  
Larry Campbell - mandolin, Dobro
Jon Herrington - electric guitar
Duke Levine - acoustic 12-string guitar
Stephan Crump - acoustic bass
Ben Wittman - drum set, harmonium
Lucy Kaplansky - acoustic guitar
 "The Gift" – 3:43
Larry Campbell - pedal steel guitar
Duke Levine - electric mandolin
Stephan Crump - acoustic bass
Ben Wittman - floor tom
Richard Shindell - background vocals
Lucy Kaplansky - acoustic guitar

Charts

Credits

Musicians
See track listing above

Production
Produced by Ben Wittman
Arranged by Ben Wittman, Larry Campbell, Stephan Crump, & Duke Levine
Recorded in August 2006 in New York City at Avatar Recordings
Additional recording by Ben Wittman at Wittman Productions
Mixed by Ben Wisch at Bailey Building and Loan
Mastered by David Glasser at Airshow Mastering

Artwork
Graphic design - Carla Leighton for Gloo Design, NY
Photography - C. Taylor Crothers
Back cover photo - Rick Litvin
Hair & Makeup - Jim Crawford

References

External links 
Over the Hills page at Red House Records

2007 albums
Lucy Kaplansky albums
Red House Records albums